The International Space Station (ISS) External Active Thermal Control System (EATCS) maintains an equilibrium when the ISS environment or heat loads exceed the capabilities of the Passive Thermal Control System (PTCS). Note Elements of the PTCS are external surface materials, insulation such as Multi-Layer Insulation (MLI), or Heat Pipes. The EATCS provides heat rejection capabilities for all the U.S. pressurized modules, the Japanese Experiment Module (JEM), the Columbus Orbital Facility (COF), and the main power distribution electronics of the S0, S1 and P1 Trusses. The EATCS consists of two independent Loops (Loop A & Loop B), which both use mechanically pumped fluid state ammonia in closed-loop circuits. The EATCS is capable of rejecting up to 70 kW, and provides a substantial upgrade in heat rejection capacity from the 14 kW capability of the Early External Active Thermal Control System (EEATCS) via the Early Ammonia Servicer (EAS), which was launched on STS-105 and installed onto the P6 Truss.

There are two independent Loops (Loop A & Loop B) that combined make up the EATCS. The EATCS Loops perform three primary functions:

 Heat Collection - Each Loop draws heat from five Heat Exchangers (HXs) mounted on the Destiny Laboratory, Node-2 & Node-3 as well as cold plates under three DC-to-DC Conversion Units (DDCUs) (one DDCU each on each Loop on the P1/S1 Trusses and two DDCUs each on each Loop on the S0 Truss) and two Main Bus Switching Units (MBSUs) on each Loop on the S0 Truss (see schematic below and Orbital Replacement Units (ORUs) for design of these units);
 Heat Transportation - The Pump Module (PM) provides flow and accumulator functions and maintains proper temperature control at the pump outlet for each Loop. The PM consists of a single pump, a fixed charge accumulator, a Pump & Control Valve Package (PCVP) containing a firmware controller, startup heaters, isolation valves, and various sensors for monitoring performance. The Nitrogen Tank Assembly (NTA) controls the flow of ammonia out of the Ammonia Tank Assembly (ATA). The ATA contains two flexible, chambers incorporated into its ammonia tanks that expand as pressurized nitrogen from the NTA expels liquid ammonia out of the ATA. The major components in the ATA include two ammonia storage tanks, isolation valves, heaters, and various temperature, pressure, and quantity sensors;
 Heat Rejection - Ammonia passes from the ATA through a two way path of the Flex Hose Rotary Coupler (FHRC) where heat captured while passing through the Heat Exchangers is directed to be expelled through the Heat Rejection System Radiators (HRSRs). The radiators are rotated by the Thermal Rotary Radiator Joint (TRRJ) which continually rotates the radiator wing for optimum cooling.

References

See also
International Space Station (ISS)
Integrated Truss Structure (ITS)
Orbital Replacement Units (ORUs)
Electrical system of the International Space Station
Environmental Control and Life Support System (ECLSS)
Integrated Cargo Carrier (ICCs) 
External Stowage Platform (ESPs)
ExPRESS Logistics Carrier (ELCs)
Scientific research on the ISS

Components of the International Space Station